The 1992–93 Cupa României was the 55th edition of Romania's most prestigious football cup competition.

The title was won by FC U Craiova against Dacia Unirea Brăila.

Format
The competition is an annual knockout tournament.

First round proper matches are played on the ground of the lowest ranked team, then from the second round proper the matches are played on a neutral location.

If a match is drawn after 90 minutes, the game goes into extra time. If the match is still tied, the result is decided by penalty kicks.

In the quarter-finals and semi-finals, each tie is played as a two legs.

From the first edition, the teams from Divizia A entered in competition in sixteen finals, rule which remained till today.

First round proper

|colspan=3 style="background-color:#97DEFF;"|28 February 1993

|}

Second round proper

|colspan=3 style="background-color:#97DEFF;"|17 March 1993

|-
|colspan=3 style="background-color:#97DEFF;"|31 March 1993

|}

Quarter-finals
The matches were played on 21 April and 28 April 1993.

||2–2||1–0
||1–0||1–1
||1–0||1–1
||2–0||2–3
|}

Semi-finals
The matches were played on 12 May and 19 May 1993.

||3–2||1–1
||1–0||1–1 (a.e.t.)
|}

Final

References

External links
 romaniansoccer.ro
 Official site
 The Romanian Cup on the FRF's official site

Cupa României seasons
1992–93 in Romanian football
Romania